Country Christmas may refer to:

 Country Christmas (Loretta Lynn album)
 Country Christmas (Johnny Cash album)